East Lansing High School is a public high school in the city of East Lansing, Michigan, United States. It is managed by the East Lansing Public Schools district.

The school is located about a mile north of the Michigan State University campus. Construction started in 1956, with the school opening in September 1959. The previous high school building is now the Hannah Community Center. Since 2000, the school has undergone remodeling with the addition of several new wings and restoration of the old ones. The construction was completed in summer 2005, and the remodeled school was dedicated in September 2005.

History
The school district that is now East Lansing Public Schools was established in 1900, seven years before the city of East Lansing itself. All grade levels were taught in the original Central School, which was built in 1901. When that building burned down in 1916, classes were held in the old Peoples Church building until a second Central School could be built.

The first high school building was completed in 1926 at 819 Abbott Road. When the current high school building opened in 1959, the former school became the East Lansing Junior High School. It closed for renovation in 1968, and reopened as the John A. Hannah Middle School. The building is now a community center.

Attendance area
The district (and therefore the high school's attendance boundary), mostly in Ingham County, includes much of East Lansing, portions of Lansing and Haslett, and portions of Lansing Charter Township and Meridian Charter Township. A portion of the district is in Clinton County, where it serves portions of the parts of East Lansing in the county, as well as sections of Bath Charter Township.

Notable alumni

 Spencer Abraham: former U.S. Senator and U.S. Secretary of Energy.
 Amy (Taran) Astley: editor-in-chief of Architectural Digest as of May 2016.
 Charles Bachman: computer scientist.
 Judi Brown(-King): athlete, silver medalist in 400m hurdles in 1984 Summer Olympics.
 Jeff Brubaker: WHA and NHL ice hockey player.
 Timothy Busfield: actor.
 Lin Chambers: NASA scientist.
Ralph Evans: concert violinist.
Sam Green: filmmaker.
 Daniel Gross: author and journalist.
 Matt Hubbard: music producer and musician.
 Lela Ivey: actress.
 Brad Jones: American football linebacker for the Green Bay Packers.
 Martin Kierszenbaum: songwriter and music producer
 Randy Kinder: NFL player for the Green Bay Packers and Philadelphia Eagles.
 Amos Magee (born 1971): soccer player, coach, and front office
 Steve Maidlow: NFL player for the Cincinnati Bengals and Buffalo Bills.
 Taylor Manson: athlete, bronze medalist in mixed 4x400m relay in 2020 Summer Olympics.
 Todd Martin: tennis player, men’s singles finalist in 1994 Australian Open and 1999 US Open.
 Julie Mehretu: artist.
Drew Miller: professional ice hockey winger for the Detroit Red Wings.
Ryan Miller: NHL ice hockey player
Taylor Nichols: actor.
Robert Neller: 37th Commandant of the Marine Corps.
 Larry Page: CEO and co-founder of Google Inc.
 Ben Poquette: NBA player.
 Eric B. Schoomaker: lieutenant general and 42nd Surgeon General of the United States Army and Commanding General, United States Army Medical Command.
 Peter J. Schoomaker: four-star general and 35th Chief of Staff of the United States Army.
 Nate Silver: sabermetrician who invented PECOTA, editor in chief of FiveThirtyEight.
 Larisa Spielberg: U.S. pairs figure skating bronze medalist in 2000.
 Paul Michael Stoll (born 1985): American-Mexican basketball player
 Jeremy Turner: composer and musician.
 Farah Stockman: Pulitzer Prize winner in Commentary, 2016.

Athletics
The East Lansing High School mascot (male and female) is Troy the Trojan. Depending on sport, the main rival has variously been the Okemos Chieftains, Lansing Eastern Quakers, Holt Rams or Grand Ledge Comets.

Boys
 1936 State Class B Tennis Champion
 1936 State Class B Golf Champion
 1938 State Class B Tennis Champion
 1940 State Class B Track & Field Champion
 1941 State Class B Track & Field Champion
 1941 State Class B Golf Champion
 1948 State Class B Golf Champion
 1951 State Class B Tennis Champion
 1958 State Class B Basketball
 1959 State Class B-C-D Swimming & Diving Champion
 1967 State Class A Cross Country
 1981 State Open Class Skiing Champion
 1983 State Class A Golf Champion
 1987 State Class A Soccer Champion
 1987 State Class A Swimming & Diving Champion
 1991 State Class A Football
 1993 State Class A Golf Champion
 1998 State Class A Track & Field Champion
 2000 State Division II Golf Champion
 2002 State Division 2 Soccer Champion
 2005 State Division 2 Soccer Champion
 2007 State Division 2 Tennis Champion
 2008 State Division 2 Tennis Champion
 2011 State Division 2 Track & Field Champion
 2013 State Division 2 Soccer Champion
2014 State Division 2 Soccer Champion

Girls
1973 State Open Class Swimming Champion
1974 State Open Class Swimming Champion
1975 State Open Class Swimming Champion
1975 State Division 2 Tennis Champion
1976 State Class A Swimming & Diving Champion
1977 State Class A Swimming & Diving Champion
1978 State Class A Swimming & Diving Champion
1987 State Open Class Golf Champion
1992 State Class A Golf Champion
1997 State Division 2 Tennis Champion
2009 State Division 2 Track & Field Champion
2010 State Class A Basketball Champion
2011 State Division 2 Track & Field Champion

References

External links

 

East Lansing, Michigan
Public high schools in Michigan
Schools in Ingham County, Michigan
1956 establishments in Michigan
Educational institutions established in 1956